ㅐ(ae) is a vowel in Korean hangul. The Unicode for ㅐ is U+3150. It also shares its pronunciation with ㅔ.

History
The letter was originally the combination of 'ㅏ' and 'l' as verified from the description of the "An Explanation of the Medials(中聲解)" chapter of the Hunminjeongeum Haerye.
From the 18th and 19th century, the change of pronunciations of the word is attested by confused notations with ㅔ.

Stroke order

Notes

References

Hangul jamo
Vowel letters